Tony Vittorio is a college baseball player and coach. He is currently the head coach of the Wilmington Quakers baseball team. He was the head baseball coach of the Dayton Flyers baseball program. Vittorio has been the head coach at Dayton since the 2000 season, accumulating over 350 wins and overseeing the construction of the Flyers' Woerner Field.

Early years
Vittorio grew up in Indianapolis, Indiana and graduated from Southport High School in 1984. He then attended and graduated from nearby Hanover College in 1988 with a double major in business administration and physical education. Vittorio played four years of college baseball at Hanover. Vittorio then attended the University of Kentucky, where he graduated in 1997 with a master's degree in sports management.

Career
After spending one season as a volunteer assistant at Indiana University, Vittorio landed his first head coaching job at age 24 for the Lincoln Trail Community College Statesmen. In the season prior to his arrival, Lincoln Trail had a 2–48 record, but Vittorio rebuilt the program over four seasons, winning 144 games and sending over twenty players to four-year college programs.

Vittorio then moved to the University of Kentucky, where he spent two years as an assistant coach while working on his master's degree. Vittorio was hired in 1996 by then-Division II school Indiana University – Purdue University Fort Wayne (IPFW), where he spent three seasons coaching the Mastodons, winning a total of 80 games during his tenure.

In the fall of 1999, Vittorio was hired by the University of Dayton, where he has coached since. Prior to Vittorio's arrival, Dayton had had one winning season (1998). In 2001, Vittorio guided the Flyers to a 32–26 record and a second-place finish in the Atlantic 10 West Division, marking Dayton's second winning season and first appearance in the Atlantic 10 Conference baseball tournament. In 2009, Vittorio was named Atlantic 10 Coach of the Year after leading the Flyers to a 38–19 record, a program-best 21–6 conference record, and the program's first conference regular season championship. In 2012, Vittorio led the Flyers to their first appearance in the NCAA Division I baseball tournament.

Head coaching records
The following is a table of Vittorio's yearly records as an NCAA head baseball coach.

References

Living people
Baseball coaches from Indiana
Hanover Panthers baseball players
Indiana Hoosiers baseball coaches
Kentucky Wildcats baseball coaches
Purdue Fort Wayne Mastodons baseball coaches
Dayton Flyers baseball coaches
Lincoln Trail Statesmen baseball coaches
Wilmington Quakers baseball coaches
University of Kentucky alumni

Year of birth missing (living people)
Baseball players from Indianapolis